Paradise Valley is a major river valley of the Yellowstone River in Southwestern Montana just north of Yellowstone National Park in Park County. The valley is flanked by the Absaroka Range on the east and the Gallatin Range on the west.

The Paradise Valley is separated from the Gallatin Valley and Bozeman, MT, by the Bozeman Pass. Interstate 90 passes through both communities. The valley lies predominantly along a north–south axis, and is anchored to the north by Livingston, Montana and to the south by Yankee Jim Canyon, approximately fifteen miles north of Gardiner, Montana and the north entrance of Yellowstone Park. US Highway 89 passes through the valley and into Yellowstone National Park. The valley was the route taken by early Yellowstone expeditions and the only recognized route into the park when it was established in 1872. 

The Yellowstone River flows through the valley and is noted for world-class fly fishing in the river and nearby spring creeks such as DePuy Spring Creek. The valley hosts other natural wonders such as several natural hot springs, including Chico Hot Springs near Emigrant, Montana, La Duke Hot Springs near Gardiner, and Hunter's Hot Springs near Livingston.

It is located in the southern portion of the valley on the eastern side of the river within the Absaroka mountain range.

The valley is winter range for elk, specifically The Paradise Valley Herd and The Northern Herd.

Notable residents
 Al Agnew, artist
 Casey Anderson, grizzly bear specialist, animal magnet
 John Banovich, artist/conservationist
 Richard Brautigan, poet
 Jeff Bridges, actor
 Austen S. Cargill II, billionaire heir of Cargill
 Russell Chatham, American landscape artist, author, and fly fisherman  
 Al Feldstein, Mad magazine founder
 Peter Fonda, actor/director
 Eduardo Garcia, chef, outdoorsman, public speaker
 Margot Kidder, actress
 Patrick Markey, producer
 John Mayer, singer-songwriter
 Thomas McGuane, author
 Ken Niles, radio announcer, actor
 Wendell Niles, radio announcer, actor
 Christopher Paolini, author
 Missi Pyle, actress

References

External links

Landforms of Park County, Montana
River valleys of the United States